Major General Samuel Odotei is a Ghanaian military personnel and a former Chief of Army Staff of the Ghana Army. He served as Chief of Army Staff from 20 May 2005 – 2009.

References

Ghanaian military personnel
Chiefs of Army Staff (Ghana)
Year of birth missing (living people)
Living people
Place of birth missing (living people)